The Magyar Kupa is a rugby union cup competition in Hungary.

History
The first final was contested in 1991 and won by Zöld Sólymok (Green Falcons), a possible forerunner of Elefántok.

Results

References

External links
 Les timbrés du rugby

Rugby union competitions in Hungary
1991 establishments in Hungary